Star Trek: Stargazer is a flagship series of Star Trek tie-in novels written by Michael Jan Friedman.

Characters
Many of the characters originally appeared in Friedman's 1992 novel Reunion.

Main characters in the Stargazer crew include:
 Captain Jean-Luc Picard, captain of the Stargazer
 Lieutenant Commander Gilaad Ben Zoma, first officer
 Lieutenant Commander Jack Crusher, second officer (until his death)
 Lieutenant Commander Elizabeth Wu, second officer
 Lieutenant Gerda Asmund, navigator
 Lieutenant Idun Asmund, helm officer
 Lieutenant Nol Kastiigan, science officer. He is a Kandilkari and was assigned to the Stargazer to replace the previous chief science officer, Juanita Valderrama, who had been dismissed because of unethical behaviour.
 Ensign Cole Paris, helm officer. Assigned on board the Stargazer after Ensign Joe Caber was dismissed, and replaced Caber as Ensign Andreas Nikolas's roommate. Uncle of Tom Paris.
 Dikembe Ulelo, communications officer. Replaced by an alien shapeshifter who spied on the activities of USS Stargazer. The alien was discovered and Ulelo found and reunited with the crew.
 Lieutenant Vigo, chief weapons officer
 Lieutenant Phigus Simenon, chief engineer. The crew assisted Simenon with his mating ritual on his home planet.
 Lieutenant Bill Refsland, transporter operator
 Lieutenant Peter Joseph, security chief
 Lieutenant Obal, security guard
 Ensign Andreas Nikolas, security guard. He is somewhat laid-back and not too devoted to his job. He has a way of arriving at assignments and meetings at the last minute, which has earned him the nickname "Nik of time".
 Crewperson Emily Bender, science officer
 Ensign Jiterica, science officer. Jiterica's natural form is a cloud of mist, and she has to constantly wear a heavy, awkward containment suit to facilitate interaction with the Stargazer and fellow crew members. Even the face shown in the suit's helmet and her voice are artificial, generated by a portable computer.
 Carter Greyhorse, chief medical officer

Novels

Related novels 
Novels and short fiction which include settings and characters from Stargazer.

See also 
 List of Star Trek novels
 List of Star Trek: The Next Generation novels

External links
 
 

Book series introduced in 2002
Stargazer
Stargazer
Science fiction book series